Sphallomorpha is a genus of beetles in the family Carabidae, containing the following species:

 Sphallomorpha aberrans Baehr, 1992
 Sphallomorpha acutangula Baehr, 1992
 Sphallomorpha albopicta Newman, 1850
 Sphallomorpha amabilis (Castelnau, 1867)
 Sphallomorpha atrata Baehr, 1993
 Sphallomorpha barbarae Baehr, 1992
 Sphallomorpha barbata Baehr, 1992
 Sphallomorpha biclavata Baehr, 1992
 Sphallomorpha bicolor (Castelnau, 1867)
 Sphallomorpha biguttata Baehr, 1992
 Sphallomorpha biplagiata (Castelnau, 1867)
 Sphallomorpha bivittata (Gestro, 1884)
 Sphallomorpha boops (Blackburn, 1888)
 Sphallomorpha brevistylia Baehr, 1992
 Sphallomorpha carinata Baehr, 1992
 Sphallomorpha carnavona Baehr, 1993
 Sphallomorpha castelnaui (Reiche, 1868)
 Sphallomorpha centralis (Macleay, 1888)
 Sphallomorpha centrolineata Baehr, 1992
 Sphallomorpha centroplagiata Baehr, 1992
 Sphallomorpha communis Baehr, 1992
 Sphallomorpha coriacea Baehr, 1992
 Sphallomorpha corrugata Baehr, 1992
 Sphallomorpha costalis Baehr, 1992
 Sphallomorpha dalesi Baehr, 1992
 Sphallomorpha darwini Baehr, 1992
 Sphallomorpha decipiens (Westwood, 1837)
 Sphallomorpha demarzi Baehr, 1993
 Sphallomorpha denisonensis (Castelnau, 1867)
 Sphallomorpha difficilis (Blackburn, 1901)
 Sphallomorpha discoidalis (Castelnau, 1867)
 Sphallomorpha distinguenda Baehr, 1992
 Sphallomorpha dixoni Baehr, 1992
 Sphallomorpha dubia (Castelnau, 1867)
 Sphallomorpha eungellae Baehr, 1993
 Sphallomorpha fallax (Westwood, 1837)
 Sphallomorpha flavicollis (Macleay, 1888)
 Sphallomorpha flavomarginata Baehr, 1992
 Sphallomorpha flavopicea Baehr, 1992
 Sphallomorpha froggatti (Macleay, 1888)
 Sphallomorpha fugax (Westwood, 1853)
 Sphallomorpha glabrata Baehr, 1992
 Sphallomorpha grandis (Castelnau, 1867)
 Sphallomorpha guttifera (Castelnau, 1867)
 Sphallomorpha guttigera (Newman, 1842)
 Sphallomorpha hermannsburgi Baehr, 1992
 Sphallomorpha hydroporoides (Westwood, 1853)
 Sphallomorpha impilosa Baehr, 1992
 Sphallomorpha incerta Baehr, 1992
 Sphallomorpha inornata Baehr, 1992
 Sphallomorpha interioris Baehr, 1992
 Sphallomorpha kurandae Baehr, 1994
 Sphallomorpha labralis Baehr, 1992
 Sphallomorpha laevigata (Castelnau, 1867)
 Sphallomorpha laevis (Castelnau, 1867)
 Sphallomorpha lata Baehr, 1992
 Sphallomorpha laticollis (Macleay, 1888)
 Sphallomorpha latiflava Baehr, 1992
 Sphallomorpha latior Baehr, 1993
 Sphallomorpha longiplagiata Baehr, 1992
 Sphallomorpha lustrans Baehr, 1992
 Sphallomorpha lyra Baehr, 1992
 Sphallomorpha macleayi (Masters, 1895)
 Sphallomorpha maculata (Newman, 1842)
 Sphallomorpha maculigera (Macleay, 1864)
 Sphallomorpha marginata (Castelnau, 1867)
 Sphallomorpha marginoides Baehr, 1992
 Sphallomorpha mastersii (Macleay, 1864)
 Sphallomorpha metallica Baehr, 1992
 Sphallomorpha meyeri Baehr, 1992
 Sphallomorpha minima Baehr, 1992
 Sphallomorpha minor Baehr, 1992
 Sphallomorpha mjoebergi Baehr, 1992
 Sphallomorpha monteithi Baehr, 1992
 Sphallomorpha moorei Baehr, 1992
 Sphallomorpha multipunctata Baehr, 1992
 Sphallomorpha multiseta Baehr, 1992
 Sphallomorpha murrayana Baehr, 1992
 Sphallomorpha nigrina Baehr, 1992
 Sphallomorpha nitiduloides Guerin, 1844
 Sphallomorpha obsoleta (Macleay, 1888)
 Sphallomorpha occidentalis (Castelnau, 1867)
 Sphallomorpha ochracea Baehr, 1992
 Sphallomorpha ovalis (Castelnau, 1867)
 Sphallomorpha parallela Baehr, 1992
 Sphallomorpha parva Baehr, 1992
 Sphallomorpha pauciseta Baehr, 2006
 Sphallomorpha pernigra Baehr, 1992
 Sphallomorpha picta (Castelnau, 1867)
 Sphallomorpha pilosa Baehr, 1992
 Sphallomorpha polita (Macleay, 1871)
 Sphallomorpha politoides Baehr, 1992
 Sphallomorpha polysetosa Baehr, 1992
 Sphallomorpha propinqua Baehr, 2002
 Sphallomorpha pumila Baehr, 1992
 Sphallomorpha punctata Baehr, 1992
 Sphallomorpha quadrata Baehr, 1992
 Sphallomorpha quadrilineata Baehr, 1992
 Sphallomorpha quadrimaculata (Macleay, 1864)
 Sphallomorpha quadriplagiata Baehr, 1992
 Sphallomorpha queenslandica Baehr, 1992
 Sphallomorpha rhomboidalis Baehr, 1992
 Sphallomorpha rockhamptonensis (Castelnau, 1867)
 Sphallomorpha ruficollis Baehr, 1992
 Sphallomorpha sculpturata Baehr, 1992
 Sphallomorpha sedlaceki Baehr, 1992
 Sphallomorpha semistriata (Castelnau, 1867)
 Sphallomorpha signata Baehr, 1992
 Sphallomorpha similata Baehr, 1992
 Sphallomorpha speciosa (Pascoe, 1866)
 Sphallomorpha spurgeoni Baehr, 1992
 Sphallomorpha sternoincisa Baehr, 1992
 Sphallomorpha storeyi Baehr, 1992
 Sphallomorpha striata (Castelnau, 1867)
 Sphallomorpha striatopunctata Baehr, 1992
 Sphallomorpha sulcata Baehr, 1992
 Sphallomorpha suturalis Germar, 1848
 Sphallomorpha suturata Baehr, 1994
 Sphallomorpha tamborinae Baehr, 1992
 Sphallomorpha tasmanica (Castelnau, 1867)
 Sphallomorpha territorialis Baehr, 1992
 Sphallomorpha thouzeti (Castelnau, 1867)
 Sphallomorpha thouzetoides Baehr, 1992
 Sphallomorpha tolgae Baehr, 1992
 Sphallomorpha torresia Baehr, 1992
 Sphallomorpha tozeria Baehr, 1992
 Sphallomorpha transversalis Baehr, 1992
 Sphallomorpha tropica Baehr, 1992
 Sphallomorpha tropicalis Baehr, 1992
 Sphallomorpha unicolor Baehr, 1992
 Sphallomorpha uniformis Baehr, 1992
 Sphallomorpha uptoni Baehr, 1992
 Sphallomorpha versicolor Baehr, 1992
 Sphallomorpha viridis Baehr, 1992
 Sphallomorpha vlineata Baehr, 1992
 Sphallomorpha weiri Baehr, 1992
 Sphallomorpha westralis Baehr, 1992
 Sphallomorpha westwoodi (Notman, 1925)
 Sphallomorpha wilgae Baehr, 1992

References

Pseudomorphinae